North Carolina's 33rd Senate district is one of 50 districts in the North Carolina Senate. It has been represented by Republican Carl Ford since 2019.

Geography
Since 2019, the district has included all of Rowan and Stanly counties. The district overlaps with the 66th, 76th, 77th, and 83rd state house districts.

District officeholders

Election results

2022

2020

2018

2016

2014

2012

2010

2008

2006

2004

2002

2000

References

North Carolina Senate districts
Rowan County, North Carolina
Stanly County, North Carolina